Lemaco is a brass model railway rolling stock manufacturer based in Switzerland.
Lemaco produces models at almost any scale, like HO scale, O scale, N scale, 1 gauge and 2 gauge.

History 
After 30 years spent at Fulgurex, Urs Egger founded Lemaco SA in 1985, in Ecublens, Switzerland. Later Egger's Lematech SA company was taken over by Lemaco Prestige Models SA. In 2006, the Lemaco company was acquired by Lematec SA.

External links 
 Lematec website

Model railroad manufacturers
Toy companies established in 1985
Model manufacturers of Switzerland
Swiss companies established in 1985